The Last Labyrinth is an English-language novel written by Arun Joshi. The book was first published in 1981 and the for the book Joshi was awarded Sahitya Akademi Award in 1982.

References 

Sahitya Akademi Award-winning works
20th-century Indian novels
Indian English-language novels